Sherri is an American sitcom starring Sherri Shepherd that ran on Lifetime for one season from October 5, 2009, to December 1, 2009. The show is based on Shepherd's life. The first preview of the show aired on September 4, 2009. Sherri was the first comedy series ever to be owned by Lifetime. The network picked up 12 episodes of the show which were produced in New York by Lifetime.

Plot 
Sherri centers around Sherri Robinson (Sherri Shepherd), a newly single mom, paralegal and part-time comedian/actress who tries to get back into the dating scene and move on with her life after divorcing her cheating husband. Sherri finds solace and support among her girlfriends at the office while juggling her hectic life.

Cast
 Sherri Shepherd as Sherri Robinson
 Tammy Townsend as Celia Marson
 Malcolm-Jamal Warner as Kevin Robinson
 Brandon Khalil as Bo Robinson
 Kali Rocha as Summer Dickie
 Elizabeth Regen as Angie Ghilardi

Recurring
 James Avery as Redmond
 Kate Reinders as Paula Morgan
 Michael Boatman as Dr. Randolph "Randy" Gregg
 Cynthia Caponera as Donna

Episodes

Home media
The Complete Season One was released on DVD in Region 1 on April 27, 2010.

Ratings

References

External links
 

2009 American television series debuts
2009 American television series endings
2000s American black sitcoms
English-language television shows
Cultural depictions of actors
Lifetime (TV network) original programming
Television series by ABC Studios